Lucian Gabriel Wiina Msamati (born 5 March 1976) is a British-Tanzanian actor. He played Salladhor Saan in HBO series Game of Thrones, and was the first black actor to play Iago in the Royal Shakespeare Company's 2015 production of Othello.

Early life and education
Msamati was born at St Thomas' Hospital, London on  5 March 1976 and brought up in Zimbabwe by his Tanzanian parents, a doctor and a nurse. After secondary education at Prince Edward School in Harare, he studied towards a BA honours degree in French and Portuguese at the University of Zimbabwe from 1995 to 1997.

Career

Theatre

After university, he took a day-job as an advertising copywriter and freelance radio presenter. He also worked as a voice-over artist, compere and after-dinner speaker.

In 1994, Msamati and school friends Shaheen Jassat (deceased), Craig and Gavin Peter, Kevin Hanssen, Roy Chizivano, Sarah Norman founded what would become Zimbabwe's acclaimed Over the Edge Theatre Company in Harare, later joined by Erica Glyn-Jones, Zane E. Lucas, Chipo Chung, Karin Alexander, Rob Hollands and Michael Pearce. The company celebrated its 10th anniversary in December 2004, having flown the Zimbabwe flag across Europe, the United States and South Africa. The last few years have seen individual members pursuing other interests. Though not officially disbanded, there are no immediate plans of an Over the Edge reunion. From 1998 to 2001, the company performed at the Edinburgh Festival Fringe in Edinburgh, Scotland; some plays were written by Msamati.

In November 2010, Msamati was appointed the Artistic Director of British-African theatre company Tiata Fahodzi, until being succeeded in 2014 by Natalie Ibu.
He has continued to work with Tiata Fahodzi, directing Boi Boi is Dead in February–March 2015.

In the spring of 2015, Msamati became the first black actor ever to play Iago in a Royal Shakespeare Company production of Othello (with Hugh Quarshie in the title role).

From October 2016 to March 2017 and from February to 24 April 2018, he performed in the leading role of Antonio Salieri in Peter Shaffer's play Amadeus at the National Theatre, a performance which Michael Billington, in a four-starred review for The Guardian, described as "excellent".

In 2019 he starred as Sam in Master Harold and the Boys at the Royal National Theatre.

Msamati has appeared in several other theatrical productions in London, UK, including:

Fabulation, Tricycle Theatre
Gem of the Ocean, Tricycle Theatre
I.D., Almeida Theatre
Mourning Becomes Electra, Royal National Theatre
The Overwhelming, Royal National Theatre
Pericles, Prince of Tyre, played the title role, Royal Shakespeare Company
President of an Empty Room, Royal National Theatre
The Resistible Rise of Arturo Ui, Lyric Hammersmith
Walk Hard, Tricycle Theatre
Death and the King's Horseman, Royal National Theatre
Ruined, Almeida Theatre
Clybourne Park, Royal Court Theatre

Television
He has also appeared in several television productions, including episodes of the television series Ultimate Force and Spooks. In 2008, he took on his most prominent role, playing JLB Matekoni in the BBC/HBO-produced series The No. 1 Ladies' Detective Agency. He has guest starred in episodes of the BBC television series Luther, Ashes to Ashes, Doctor Who, Taboo, and Death in Paradise, as well as playing the part of the pirate Salladhor Saan in the HBO series Game of Thrones.
He recently appeared as Lord Faa in His Dark Materials on BBC One. In 2020 Msamati appeared as Ed Dumani in Sky Atlantic’s Gangs of London and in an episode of the BBC's production of Alan Bennett's Talking Heads.

Film
Msamati appeared in the film The International (2009). Other film credits include Lumumba (1999), directed by Raoul Peck; the animated feature The Legend of the Sky Kingdom (2003), directed by Roger Hawkins and Richard II, directed by Rupert Goold.

Radio
Msamati appeared as Matthew in the BBC Radio 4 drama Burned to Nothing (2011) by Rex Obano.

Personal life
Msamati permanently moved to the UK in 2003, and now resides in London. He is married and has two children, a son and a daughter.

Filmography

Television

Film

References

External links 

1976 births
Living people
20th-century British male actors
20th-century Zimbabwean male actors
21st-century British male actors
21st-century Zimbabwean male actors
Actors from Harare
Alumni of Prince Edward School
Black British male actors
British male dramatists and playwrights
British male film actors
British male stage actors
British male television actors
British male voice actors
English people of Tanzanian descent
Male actors from London
People from the London Borough of Lambeth
Shakespearean actors
University of Zimbabwe alumni
Zimbabwean dramatists and playwrights
Zimbabwean male film actors
Zimbabwean male stage actors
Zimbabwean male television actors
Zimbabwean male voice actors